Bill & Ted's Excellent Adventure is a single player graphic adventure video game for the Commodore 64, Amiga and MS-DOS platforms. The game was developed by Off the Wall Productions and published by Capstone Software. This video game is a part of the Bill & Ted franchise and the concept is based on the 1989 film Bill & Ted's Excellent Adventure.

Gameplay
The player controls both Bill and Ted as they travel through different time periods, collect artifacts, and talk to locals to help find the historical figures for their oral report in present-day San Dimas. As in the film, if player does not finish the game in a set amount of time, the player fails the history report, thus losing the game.

Release
Capstone started a trivia contest in Computer Gaming World magazine, consisting of 10 questions about the game. The reader had to answer the questions on a card and send it to Capstone. The first fifty readers to submit the most correct answers, won "Bill & Ted" T-shirts.

Reception

References

See also
Bill & Ted's Excellent Video Game Adventure
Bill & Ted's Excellent Game Boy Adventure
Bill & Ted's Excellent Adventure (Atari Lynx video game)

1989 video games
Amiga games
Bill & Ted video games
Commodore 64 games
DOS games
Video games about time travel
Video games developed in the United States